Hans Peter Friessen Wutteke (born 10 September 1949) is a Mexican former professional footballer that played for various football clubs in the late 1960s and 1970s as a forward.

Club career
Born in Guadalajara, Friessen played in the early 1970s with Atlas as a forward debuting only two games, later on he made the transfer to Chivas de Guadalajara. As Chivas had a history of only contracting Mexican players, the club's supporters questioned Friessen's inclusion in the club due to his German ancestry and surname.

For the 1973–1974 season, Friessen was transferred to Tecos UAG, who were playing in the Second Division, and became league champions with them, earning the promotion to the Primera División. Halfway through the 1970s, Friessen's parents considered and decided that football was not their son's future thus the early retirement of Friessen.

Personal life
Friessen was born in Mexico to Mexican-born parents of German descent. Friessen received the nickname El Güerito due to his blond hair.

Honours
Tecos
Segunda División Profesional: 1974–75

References 

1949 births
Living people
Footballers from Guadalajara, Jalisco
Mexican people of German descent
Association football forwards
Mexican footballers
Atlas F.C. footballers
C.D. Guadalajara footballers
Tecos F.C. footballers
Liga MX players